Leptobrachium lumadorum is a species of frog in the family Megophryidae from the islands of Basilan and Mindanao in the Philippines.

References

lumadorum
Amphibians described in 2010